Louise Clare Kenny  (born 1970) is a British physician who is Professor and Executive Pro-Vice-Chancellor at the University of Liverpool. She was elected an Commander of the Order of the British Empire in the 2022 New Year Honours.

Early life and education 
Kenny was born and raised in Liverpool. Her grandparents were Irish immigrants who moved to Liverpool during the Great Depression. Her mother was born during the Liverpool Blitz, an attack that killed Kenny's great aunt and her children. Kenny has said that she always wanted to become a doctor. As a teenager, she worked in a café in the Great Homer Street market. She studied medicine at the University of Liverpool, where she initially intended to become a cardiologist. She changed her mind the moment she saw a baby being born. After training as a senior house officer, she started a doctoral research programme at the University of Nottingham funded by the Medical Research Council and WellBeing for Women.

Career 
In 2006, Kenny was appointed a Consultant Obstetrician and Gynaecologist at Cork University Hospital. She specialised in hypertensive disease of pregnancy.

In 2013, Kenny founded the Science Foundation Ireland Irish Centre for Fetal and Neonatal Translational Research (INFANT), which is based at the University College Cork. The centre focusses on improving health outcome for mothers and babies around the world. INFANT is involved with various studies into issues that impact pregnant women, including pre-eclampsia, preterm birth and intrauterine growth restriction. At INFANT, Kenny focussed on the identification of biomarkers that may indicate women are at risk of pre-eclampsia.  Kenny was involved with overturning the Irish ban on abortion.

In 2017, Kenny moved to the University of Liverpool, where she was made Executive Pro Vice Chancellor. Geraldine Boylan was appointed Director of the INFANT upon her departure. At Liverpool, Kenny is part of a research programme that looks to improve the health of children who grow up in Liverpool City.

Awards and honours 
 2015 Science Foundation Ireland Researcher of the Year
 2015 Tatler Magazine Woman of the Year
 2017  Guaranteed Irish Science Hero

She was appointed Commander of the Order of the British Empire (CBE) in the 2022 New Year Honours for services to research in the NHS.

Selected publications

References 

1970 births
Living people
Commanders of the Order of the British Empire
Alumni of the University of Nottingham
Academics of the University of Liverpool
English obstetricians
English gynaecologists
Academics of University College Cork